"Happy Up Here" is a song by Norwegian electronic music duo Röyksopp, released as a free download from their album Junior. The one-track digital single was also released in selected stores on 19 January 2009, while the physical single and digital EP with remixes were released on 16 March 2009. The song sampled Parliament's 1976 single, "Do That Stuff".

Track listings

12" vinyl
 "Happy Up Here" (Boys Noize  Remix) – 5:33
 "Happy Up Here" – 2:44
 "Happy Up Here" (Breakbot Remix) – 2:55
 "Happy Up Here" (Datassette Remix) – 5:28

7" vinyl
 "Happy Up Here" (Holy Fuck Remix) – 03:43
 "Happy Up Here" – 2:44

Music video
The music video, directed by Reuben Sutherland, was released online on 25 February 2009 via the band's official website, as well as on their official YouTube channel. It features panning shots of a cityscape, with floating boxes lit up by light bulbs. It is eventually made apparent that the boxes are a 3D version of the aliens featured in the old arcade classic Space Invaders and the video is subsequently played out like the game, with cars on the ground serving as the defence. The video ends when the remaining aliens retreat.

Charts

References

2009 singles
Röyksopp songs
Songs written by George Clinton (funk musician)
Songs written by Bernie Worrell
2009 songs
Astralwerks singles
Wall of Sound (record label) singles
Songs written by Svein Berge
Songs written by Torbjørn Brundtland
Songs written by Garry Shider